Alphonse Béni (1946 – 12 March 2023) was a Cameroonian actor and movie director. He made several films in Cameroon, acted in French erotic comedies and played a ninja in Godfrey Ho's "ninja" flicks Black Ninja. He was credited as Alfons Bény and Chris Kelly in some films.

Béni died on 12 March 2023, at the age of 71.

References

External links
Biography of Alphonse Beni - Alphonse Béni's biographical page, with reviews on some of his movies

1946 births
2023 deaths
Cameroonian male actors
Cameroonian film directors
People from Nkongsamba